Hello Cheyenne or Hello Cheyenne! is a 1928 American silent Western film directed by Eugene Forde and starring Tom Mix, Caryl Lincoln and Jack Baston. Two rival telephone companies attempt to be the first to connect Cheyenne in Wyoming.

Cast
 Tom Mix as Tom Remington  
 Caryl Lincoln as Diana Cody  
 Jack Baston as Buck Lassiter  
 Martin Faust as Jeff Bardeen  
 Joseph W. Girard as Fremont Cody 
 William Caress as Bus Driver 
 Al St. John as Zip Coon

References

Bibliography 
 Jensen, Richard D. The Amazing Tom Mix: The Most Famous Cowboy of the Movies. 2005.

External links 
 

1928 Western (genre) films
Films directed by Eugene Forde
1928 films
American black-and-white films
Fox Film films
Silent American Western (genre) films
1920s English-language films
1920s American films